Drosera pallida, the pale rainbow, is a climbing or scrambling perennial tuberous species in the carnivorous plant genus Drosera. It is endemic to Western Australia and grows on sandplains, heathland, or near coastal plain lakes in deep sand or laterite. White flowers bloom from July to November.

Drosera pallida was first described by John Lindley in his 1839 work, A sketch of the vegetation of the Swan River Colony.

See also
List of Drosera species

References

Carnivorous plants of Australia
Caryophyllales of Australia
Eudicots of Western Australia
Plants described in 1839
pallida